Villa Nueva may mean any of the following geographical locations:
Argentina
Villa Nueva, Buenos Aires
Villa Nueva, Córdoba
Villa Nueva, Mendoza
Villa Nueva, Santiago del Estero
Guatemala
Villa Nueva, Guatemala
Mexico
Villa Nueva, Oaxaca
Villa Nueva: former name of Sacramento, Coahuila

See also
Villanueva (disambiguation)